André Eriksen (born 22 October 1975) is a Norwegian multi-platform artist with a career as an actor, rapper, and graffiti artist. He is best known as one of the lead vocalists in the Norwegian rap group Warlocks, which had commercial success in Scandinavia in the 1990s. He is considered a pioneer of Norwegian hip hop.

Early life
Eriksen grew up in Stovner bydel, a low income neighborhood in Oslo with a 53% immigrant population. He dropped out of school as a teenager and started making music and painting graffiti with friends in his neighborhood. Both his music and art were anti-establishment and Eriksen was arrested several times for graffiti. In 1995 he was in police custody when his first album with the band Warlocks was released. The incident caught media attention and made Eriksen a public figure. Together with his brother Kevin Eriksen and friend Håkon Lund they became spokesmen for the controversial Norwegian graffiti community. Eriksen won the Norwegian break dance championships in 1997, both solo and with the crew Atomic B-Boys. Together with the rest of the members of Atomic B-Boys, Eriksen wrote, directed, and played in  "Evolution of Style", at Black Box Theatre, later picked up by the Norwegian Riksteatret, Kiasma in Helsinki and Kulturhuset in Stockholm. This was the first of many theatre shows he did with Atomic B-Boys. Eriksen performed in several contemporary dance performances with the Swedish ensemble Moves Per Minute, and toured with the Swedish Riksteatern several times.

Film career
Eriksen debuted his acting career in the film Nokas (2010), directed by Erik Skjoldbjaerg, about a real bank robbery that happened in downtown Stavanger in 2004. Skjoldbjaerg then hired Eriksen to play Aksel Hennie’s brother in the film Pionér (2013). Since then, Eriksen has appeared in a variety of American and Scandinavian television shows and movies. He has played Norse god Odin in Vikings. In 2021, he worked with Aksel Hennie and Noomi Rapace on The Trip with director Tommy Wirkola, and most recently joined the cast of Tommy Wirkola's newest Christmas action comedy film, Violent Night, together with David Harbour, John Leguizamo, Beverly D'Angelo, and others.

Filmography

Music/Hip Hop Career

Andre Eriksen (stage name "Tech Rock"), his brother Kevin Eriksen ("Karma"), and their friend Håkon Lund ("Hawk") formed the hip-hop trio Warlocks (band) in 1992, releasing their debut album Lyrical Marksmen, on a local independent label (dBut Records) in 1995.

Following the success of Lyrical Marksmen, they were picked up by Norway’s leading rap label Tee Productions (owned by Tommy Tee), releasing three additional studio albums and a variety of singles in collaboration with Tee Productions over the next several years, including the widely popular song "Takin Ova" (feat N-Light-N, Diaz, Warlocks, Opaque, and Father Blanco) (1998). The album Afterlife, released in 2001, won the 2002 Norwegian Alarm Prize (category: hip hop / rap). Warlocks released their final album entitled The Never Ending Story in 2005 with C+C Records. Andre has toured Europe and Scandinavia numerous times with Warlocks and has shared stages with artists like The Beastie Boys, House Of Pain, Wu Tang Clan, 50 Cent and many more.

Discography

Break Dance

André Eriksen was a member of the break dance crew Atomic B-Boys, together with Lars "PayTwo" Undli and Bjørn "Sean" Hagen. The crew represented Norway in several international competitions and "jams" and held the title as Norwegian champions 1997–2000. Andre won Scandinavian Battle Of The Year 2000 together with the group Nasty9 and represented the Nordic countries in International Battle Of The Year 2000.

References

External links 
 Andre Eriksen IMDb
 TP AllStars - Takin Ova (Live at Spellemann 2016)
 Warlocks Spotify

Norwegian musicians
Living people
1975 births